A list of films produced in France in 1944. Film production was at a low due to the height of the Second World War.

See also
 1944 in France

References

External links
 French films of 1944 at the Internet Movie Database
French films of 1944 at Cinema-francais.fr

1944
Films
French